A Flora is a book or other work which describes the plant species occurring in an area or time period, often with the aim of allowing identification. The term is usually capitalized to distinguish it from the use of "flora" to mean the plants rather than their descriptions. Some classic and modern Floras are listed below.

Traditionally Floras are books, but some are now published on CD-ROM or websites. The area that a Flora covers can be either geographically or politically defined. Floras usually require some specialist botanical knowledge to use with any effectiveness.

A Flora often contains diagnostic keys. Often these are dichotomous keys, which require the user to repeatedly examine a plant, and decide which one of two alternatives given in the Flora best applies to the plant.

Floras produced at a local or regional level rarely contain identification keys. Instead they aim to impart more detailed understanding of the local status and distribution of that area's plants. Maps showing species distribution may be included, and nowadays are computer-generated from biological databases. Specific reference may be made to new arrivals and historic records in order to impart understanding of the changes in an area's vegetation over time.

Classic Floras

Europe
 Sylva Hercynia, Johannes Thal. Germany 1588
 Hortus Lusatiae, Johannes Franke. Germany 1594
 Stirpium et fossilium Silesiae Catalogus, Caspar Schwenckfeldt. Germany 1600
 Flora Londinensis, William Curtis. England 1777–1798
 Flora Graeca, John Sibthorp. (England) 1806–1840
 Flora Danica, Simon Paulli. Denmark, 1847.
 Flora Jenensis, Heinrich Bernhard Rupp  Germany, 1718.
 Flora Suecica, Carl Linnaeus. 1745.

India
 Hortus indicus malabaricus, Hendrik van Rheede 1683–1703

Indonesia
  Flora Javae, Carl Ludwig Blume and Joanne Baptista Fischer. 1828.

Modern Floras

Americas

Caribbean
Britton, N. L., and Percy Wilson. Scientific Survey of Porto Rico and the Virgin Islands — Volume V, Part 1: Botany of Porto Rico and the Virgin Islands: Pandanales to Thymeleales. New York: New York Academy of Sciences, 1924.

Central & South America
Flora Brasiliensis
Flora of São Paulo in Brazil
 Flora of Chile 
Manual de Plantas de Costa Rica
Flora of Ecuador
Flora of Guatemala
Flora de Nicaragua
Flora of Peru
Flora of the Guianas
Flora of Panama
Flora del Paraguay
Flora of Suriname
Flora Mesoamericana (1994-ongoing) Introduction
Flora of the Venezuelan Guayana
Flora Neotropica (1968-ongoing) Organising committee website .

North America
Flora of North America
Kearney, Thomas H. Arizona Flora. University of California Press, 1940.
Hickman, James C., editor.  The Jepson Manual: Higher Plants of California.  University of California Press, 1993.
Hultén, Eric. Flora of Alaska and Neighboring Territories: A Manual of the Vascular Plants. Stanford University Press, 1968.
Radford, Albert E. Manual of the Vascular Flora of the Carolinas. University of North Carolina Press, 1968.
Wilhelm, G. and L. Rericha. Flora of the Chicago Region: A Floristic and Ecological Synthesis. Indiana Academy of Science, 2017.
Hitchcock, C. Leo, and Arthur Cronquist. Flora of the Pacific Northwest. University of Washington Press, 1973.
Chadde, Steve W.. A Great Lakes Wetland Flora. 2nd ed. Pocketflora Press, 2002. 
Strausbaugh, P. D. and E. L. Core. Flora of West Virginia. 2nd ed. Seneca Books Inc., 1964. 
Rhoads, A. F. and T. A Block. The Plants of Pennsylvania. University of Pennsylvania Press, 2000. 
Britton, N. L. and Hon. A. Brown. An Illustrated Flora of the Northern United States and Canada. In three volumes. Dover Publications, 1913, 1970. 
Stone, W. The Plants of Southern New Jersey. Annual Report of the State Museum of New Jersey, 1910.

Asia
China and Japan
 Flora of China
 Flora of China in eFloras
 Flora of Japan
Southeast Asia
 Flora of Thailand Flora of Thailand
 Florae Siamensis Enumeratio
 Flora Malesiana (1984-ongoing) About Flora Malesiana .
 Flora of the Malay Peninsula
 Flore du Cambodge, du Laos et du Viêtnam
Indian region and Sri Lanka
 Flora of Bhutan
 Flora of the Presidency of Madras by J.S. Gamble (1915–36)
 Flora of Nepal
 Bengal Plants by D. Prain (1903)
 Flora of the upper Gangetic plains by J. F. Duthie (1903–29)
 Botany of Bihar and Orissa by H.H. Haines (1921–25)
 Flora of British India (1872–1897) by Sir J.D. Hooker
Middle East and western Asia
 Flora of Turkey
 Flora Iranica
 Flora Palaestina:
 M. Zohary (1966). Flora Palaestina part 1.
 M. Zohary (1972). Flora Palaestina part 2.
 N. Feinbrun (1978). Flora Palaestina part 3.
 N. Feinbrun (1986). Flora Palaestina part 4.
 A.  Danin, (2004). Distribution Atlas of Plants in the Flora Palaestina Area (Flora Palaestina part 5).
 Online updates: https://web.archive.org/web/20070828033350/http://flora.huji.ac.il/browse.asp?lang=en&action=showfile&fileid=14005

Australasia

 Flora of Australia
Flora of New Zealand  series:
Allan, H.H. 1961, reprinted 1982. Flora of New Zealand. Volume I: Indigenous Tracheophyta - Psilopsida, Lycopsida, Filicopsida, Gymnospermae, Dicotyledons. .
Moore, L.B.; Edgar, E. 1970, reprinted 1976. Flora of New Zealand. Volume II: Indigenous Tracheophyta - Monocotyledons except Graminae. .
Healy, A.J.; Edgar, E. 1980. Flora of New Zealand Volume III. Adventive Cyperaceous, Petalous & Spathaceous Monocotyledons. .
Webb, C.J.; Sykes, W.R.; Garnock-Jones, P.J. 1988. Flora of New Zealand Volume IV: Naturalised Pteridophytes, Gymnosperms, Dicotyledons. .
Edgar, E.; Connor, H.E. 2000. Flora of New Zealand Volume V: Grasses. .
Volumes I-V: First electronic edition, Landcare Research, June 2004. Transcribed by A.D. Wilton and I.M.L. Andres.
Galloway, D.J. 1985. Flora of New Zealand: Lichens. .
Croasdale, H.; Flint, E.A. 1986. Flora of New Zealand: Desmids. Volume I. .
Croasdale, H.; Flint, E.A. 1988. Flora of New Zealand: Desmids. Volume II. .
Croasdale, H.; Flint, E.A.; Racine, M.M. 1994. Flora of New Zealand: Desmids. Volume III. .
Sykes, W.R.; West, C.J.; Beever, J.E.; Fife, A.J. 2000. Kermadec Islands Flora - Special Edition. .

Pacific Islands

 Flora Vitiensis Nova, a New Flora of Fiji Manual of the Flowering Plants of Hawai‘i, Warren L. Wagner and Derral R. Herbst (1991) + suppl. 
 Flore de la Nouvelle-Calédonie (New Caledonia
 Flore de la Polynésie Française (J. Florence, vol. 1 & 2, 1997 & 2004)

Europe

British Isles
 Bowen, Humphry. The Flora of Berkshire.  Oxford: Holywell Press, 1968. .
 Morton, Osbourne. Marine Algae of Northern Ireland. Belfast: Ulster Museum, 1994. 
 Stace, Clive Anthony, and Hilli Thompson (illustrator). A New Flora of the British Isles. 2nd ed. Cambridge University Press, 1997. .
 Beesley, S. and J. Wilde. Urban Flora of Belfast. Belfast: Institute of Irish Studies, Queen's University of Belfast, 1997.
 Killick, John, Roy Perry and Stan Woodell. Flora of Oxfordshire. Pisces Publications, 1998. .
 Bowen, Humphry. The Flora of Dorset. Pisces Publications, 2000. .
 Milliken, William and Sam Bridgewater. Flora Celtica – Plants and people in Celtic Europe. Birlinn, 2004. . Paperback edition, 2013. .

Rest of Europe
 Flora Europaea at the site of The Royal Botanical Gardens of Edinburgh Flora Europaea
 Flora of Europe
 Flora Gallica, published by Société Botanique de France
 Flora iberica
 Flora of Acores 
 Flora Danica
 Flora of Romania

Africa and Madagascar

 Flore du Gabon
 Flore du Cameroun
 Flora of Tropical Africa
 Flora of Tropical East Africa
 Flora of West Tropical Africa
 Flore de la Côte d'Ivoire
 Flora Capensis
 Flora Zambesiaca''
 Flora of South Africa
 Flore du Rwanda
 Flore de Madagascar et des Comores
Flore pratique du Maroc

References

See also
List of electronic floras